Jamesonia is a genus of ferns in the subfamily Pteridoideae of the family Pteridaceae. It now includes the formerly separate genus Eriosorus.

Description
Species of Jamesonia are terrestrial or grow on rocks. They vary considerably in their detailed morphology. The rhizomes are short, dark brown, and creeping, with a more or less dense covering of hairs and bristles. The fertile and infertile fronds are similar. Species show one of two different frond morphologies, related to habitat. These were formerly used to distinguish Jamesonia and Eriosorus, but do not correspond to the evolutionary history of the species. Species with "Jamesonia-type" morphology have many fronds with short, often leathery pinnae, and are associated with exposed habitats. Species with "Eriosorus-type" morphology have fewer fronds with longer, thinner pinnae, and are associated with more sheltered areas including cloud forests. The stalks (petioles and rachises) of the frond are dark brown and usually grooved on the upper (adaxial) surface. The sori occur along the veins of the segments of the fronds or are sometimes spread more widely on the lower (abaxial) surface of the frond.

Taxonomy
The genus Jamesonia was first described by William Jackson Hooker and Robert Kaye Greville in 1830, initially with one species, Jamesonia pulchra. The genus name of Jamesonia was in honour of William Jameson (1796–1873), who was a Scottish-Ecuadorian botanist. 
The genus Eriosorus, proposed by Antoine Fée in 1852, was recognized as closely related, both genera being placed in the taenitidoid group of the subfamily Pteridoideae. A molecular phylogenetic study in 2004 showed that neither genus was monophyletic on its own, but that together they formed a clade. Subsequent classifications have treated the two as a single genus, Jamesonia. A further study in 2015 showed that the genus Nephopteris with the sole species N. maxonii belonged in the same clade. It is now also included in Jamesonia.

Phylogeny
Within the subfamily Pteridoideae, Jamesonia forms a clade with five other genera, the so-called "JAPSTT" clade, which is one of four major clades within the subfamily Pteridoideae identified in a 2017 study.

Species

Jamesonia accrescens (A.F.Tryon) Christenh.
Jamesonia alstonii A.F.Tryon
Jamesonia angusta (M.Kessler & A.R.Sm.) Christenh.
Jamesonia ascendens (A.R.Sm. & M.Kessler) Christenh.
Jamesonia aureonitens (Hook.) Christenh.
Jamesonia auriculata A.F.Tryon
Jamesonia biardii (Fée) Christenh.
Jamesonia blepharum A.F.Tryon
Jamesonia bogotensis H.Karst.
Jamesonia boliviensis A.F.Tryon
Jamesonia brasiliensis Christ
Jamesonia canescens (Klotzsch) Kunze
Jamesonia caracasana (Baker) Christenh.
Jamesonia ceracea Maxon
Jamesonia cheilanthoides (Sw.) Christenh.
Jamesonia chiapensis (Maxon) Christenh.
Jamesonia cinnamomea Kunze
Jamesonia congesta (Christ) Christenh.
Jamesonia crespiana Bosco
Jamesonia cuatrecasasii A.F.Tryon
Jamesonia elongata J.Sm.
Jamesonia ewanii (A.F.Tryon) Christenh.
Jamesonia feei (Copel.) Christenh.
Jamesonia flabellata (Hook. & Grev.) Christenh.
Jamesonia flexuosa (Humb. & Bonpl.) Christenh.
Jamesonia glaberrima (Maxon) Christenh.
Jamesonia glaziovii (C.Chr.) Christenh.
Jamesonia goudotii C.Chr.
Jamesonia hirsutula (Mett.) Christenh.
Jamesonia hirta (Kunth) Christenh.
Jamesonia hispidula Kunze
Jamesonia imbricata (Cav.) Hook. & Grev.
Jamesonia insignis (Kuhn) Christenh.
Jamesonia laxa Kuntze
Jamesonia lechleri (Kuhn) Christenh.
Jamesonia lindigii (Mett.) Christenh.
Jamesonia longipetiolata (Hieron.) Christenh.
Jamesonia madidiensis (M.Kessler & A.R.Sm.) Christenh.
Jamesonia mathewsii (Hook.) Christenh.
Jamesonia maxonii (Lellinger) Pabón-Mora & F.González
Jamesonia novogranatensis (A.F.Tryon) Christenh.
Jamesonia orbignyana (Kuhn) Christenh.
Jamesonia osteniana (Dutra) Gastony
Jamesonia paucifolia (A.C.Sm.) Christenh.
Jamesonia peruviana A.F.Tryon
Jamesonia pulchra Hook. & Grev.
Jamesonia robusta H.Karst.
Jamesonia rotundifolia Fée
Jamesonia rufescens (Fée) Christenh.
Jamesonia scalaris Kunze
Jamesonia scammaniae A.F.Tryon
Jamesonia setulosa (Hieron.) Christenh.
Jamesonia stuebelii (Hieron.) Christenh.
Jamesonia vellea (A.F.Tryon) Christenh.
Jamesonia verticalis Kunze
Jamesonia warscewiczii (Mett.) Christenh.
Jamesonia wurdackii (A.F.Tryon) Christenh.

References

Bibliography

 
 
 

Pteridaceae
Ferns of the Americas
Flora of Central America
Flora of South America
Ferns of Brazil
Ferns of Mexico
Fern genera